"Taken" is a song by New Zealand band Stellar*, release as the second single from their second album, Magic Line (2001), in January 2002. It became the band's last top-10 single in New Zealand, reaching number six. The single includes a dance remix of "All It Takes" by former Nine Inch Nails member Charlie Clouser as well as an acoustic version of the title track, recorded at the now defunct Helen Young Studios in December 2001.

Background
Vocalist Boh Runga said that she liked the song before Jack Joseph Puig mixed it, but after he did, she liked the song even more, calling it "sexy".

Track listing
New Zealand CD single
 "Taken"
 "All It Takes" (The Charlie Clouser remix)
 "Taken" (acoustic)

Credits and personnel
Credits are lifted from the New Zealand CD single liner notes.

Studios
 Recorded at The Lockup (Sydney, Australia) and Helen Young Studios (Auckland, New Zealand)
 Mixed at Ocean Way Studios (Los Angeles)
 Mastered at Gateway Mastering (Portland, Maine, US)

Personnel

 Boh Runga – writing
 Andrew Maclaren – writing
 Stellar* – production
 Tom Bailey – production
 Malcolm Welsford – additional production
 Jack Joseph Puig – mixing
 Luke Tomes – engineering
 Bob Ludwig – mastering

Charts

References

Stellar (New Zealand band) songs
2001 songs
2002 singles
Songs written by Boh Runga